Haverford Township is a home rule municipality township in Delaware County, Pennsylvania.  Haverford is named after the town of Haverfordwest in Wales, United Kingdom.  It is a commuting suburb located due west of Philadelphia and is officially known as the Township of Haverford.  Despite being under a home rule charter since 1977, it continues to operate under a Board of Commissioners divided into wards, as do "First Class" townships that are still under the Pennsylvania Township Code. Haverford Township was founded in 1682 and incorporated in 1911.

Haverford Township contains portions of the unincorporated communities of Haverford, Ardmore, and Wynnewood as well as the census designated places of Bryn Mawr and Drexel Hill. The unincorporated community of Havertown lies wholly within Haverford Township.  The township population as of the 2020 census was 50,431, making it the 14th most populated municipality in the state.

Haverford Township holds the distinction of having hosted two different men's major golf championships at two different golf clubs: Merion Golf Club hosted the 1934, 1950, 1971, 1981, and 2013 U.S. Open, and Llanerch Country Club hosted the 1958 PGA Championship.

Haverford, along with Upper Darby, Cheltenham, Lower Merion together form as the major inner ring suburbs of Philadelphia.

History

17th century

Haverford Township was laid out by William Penn as part of the Welsh Tract or Barony. In 1681, a representative group of Welsh Quakers met with Penn to discuss their settlement having purchased forty thousand acres of land which today comprises all of Haverford, Radnor and Lower Merion Townships. "Companies of Adventurers" were formed, with the most prominent person in each taking out the patent on 5,000 acres of land as trustee. The first three families arrived in Haverford Township in 1682. Lewis David, Henry Lewis, and William Howell selected land along the southern border. The original settlers, led by John Roberts who had negotiated with William Penn in 1684 to constitute the Tract as a separate county whose local government would use the Welsh language never saw their dream realized. Early records indicate that the area was often called "Harford" a Welsh contraction of Haverford. The earliest map of Penn's province dates from 1687. (Note: on the map to the right, the word "ye" is read as "the." The "y" is the old letter "thorn" which equals "th.")

The area was primarily agricultural until the second decade of the 20th century. The census returns of 1860 show the value of livestock as $62,485.00; animals slaughtered $11,255.00; 46,049 bushels of grain harvested and the value of orchard and garden produce, $4,090.00.

The two creeks that mark part of the township boundaries, Cobbs Creek and Darby Creek provided mill seats for the early settlers.  "As early as the year 1688 a small grist-mill, known as the "Haverford Mill," was built on Cobb's Creek, near where that stream is crossed by the road leading past Haverford meeting-house. Its original owner is unknown. By searching the records, however, a little light is thrown on the history of this, one of the first mills built in Pennsylvania. Thus, Fourth month (June) 12, 1700, Richard Hayes, attorney for William Howell, acknowledged a deed to David Lloyd, attorney for Rowland Powell, " for ninety -seven acres of land with a mill called Haverford Mill, and all other appurtenances and improvements thereunto belonging," the deed bearing date Third month 30th, 1700. This seems to indicate that William Howell, one of the first settlers of the township, was the original owner." (The Indian name of Cobb's Creek was Karakung, as it is still called in that area.)

18th century

Daniel Humphreys purchased the property in 1703 and built a sawmill and fulling and dyeing mill. These were added to Dennis Kelly's holding in 1826 and became the Castle Hill Mills. This site is just north of Eagle Road on the west bank of Cobb's Creek.

On Darby Creek to the west, Richard Hayes Jr., David Morris and Samuel Lewis erected a gristmill, known as Haverford New Mill, in 1707. Later a sawmill was attached. This mill operated until 1904. Near the border with Marple Township, Humphrey Ellis operated a very early fulling mill. In 1807 Henry Lawrence built a sawmill on this site, and in 1832 his son, William, built a gristmill close by. The sawmill remained in the family ownership for more than 125 years, and was, until its demolition, the oldest industry extant in Haverford Township.

About 1800 grist and sawmills were built on the headwaters of Cobb's Creek by Peter Brown, and in 1810 Jonathan Miller built grist and sawmills at what is now the Juncture of Mill Road and Karakung Drive.

19th century

Israel Whelen Sr., built the Nitre Hall Powder Mills on Cobb's Creek, which were in operation by 1810. During the American Revolution very little black powder was manufactured in this country, and it was needed for engineering and mining. Between 1810 and 1840 these mills were the second largest powder mills in the U.S. with production of 800,000 pounds in 1812. The mills ceased operations in 1840 and were sold to Dennis Kelly, who converted them for the manufacture of cotton and wooden goods.

In 1814, Dennis Kelly borrowed capital to purchase a mill-seat on Cobb's Creek. He erected a small wooden factory known as Clinton Mills. This was a highly successful venture and, after enlarging the mill, he built Cedar Grove Mill further downstream. Dennis Kelly provided material for the U.S. government from 1817 until 1860 with contracts ranging from $1,800.00 to $41,370.00. Improved transportation opened the township to development.

20th century
The transformation of Haverford Township from an agrarian spread of farms and mills began just after the turn of the 20th century. The railroads bought acres of land west of Cobb's Creek for their planned developments. Rail lines ran from 69th Street in Upper Darby outward to Ardmore, West Chester and Norristown. Along the rail lines the railroad built the first planned suburban communities Llanerch, 1897 and the most fully developed, Brookline, 1909. While Beechwood, Oakmont and Manoa date from the same period the major housing tracts do not appear until after World War II along with the development of Chatham Park. These communities are now included under the fictitious postal address "Havertown." The first Welsh settlers called this area "Harford."

Several golf courses were developed. Merion Cricket Club Golf Association incorporated Clifton Hall an old farmhouse, in their clubhouse. They have 140 acres in the main course or East Course and 160 acres in the West Course. The Llanerch Country Club consists of 126 acres. The Pennsylvania Railroad Golf Club was established in 1925 on 109 acres bounded by Earlington Road, Manoa Road and City Line. This property was sold in 1943 to Warner West Corporation, which developed Chatham Park.

Education
The first building erected for educational purposes was the Federal School, in 1797. During the 1800s four additional one-room schools and one parochial school were built. The latter part of the 19th century was the beginning of the present school system. After World War II, additions were made to existing schools, a new high school and three one-story elementary schools were built. Today there is one middle school, one senior high, five elementary schools, four parochial schools and four private schools.

Historical sites

Lawrence Cabin 

David Lawrence was one of the early Welsh settlers in Haverford Township. He emigrated with his wife Elinor Ellis and her family in 1684, and took up part of his father-in-law's land grant. His son Henry Lawrence purchased 209 acres along Cobbs Creek in 1709. It has not been determined whether the log house predates this purchase, but a -story stone addition was built c. 1730, and later a clapboard summer kitchen was added. It became known as the Three Generation House, and remained in Lawrence family ownership until 1942.

1797 Federal School 

The first record of the purchase of land for a school in Haverford Township was October 29, 1797. Alexander Symington received 5 shillings for an irregularly shaped building lot of one quarter of an acre and three perches near the present day intersection of Darby and Coopertown Roads. Payment for the land was made by five trustees: Philip Sheaff, William Brook, Francis Lee, David Lyons and Benjamin Hayes Smith, "for the purpose of erecting a school thereon for the use of said Township of Haverford". The 1797 Federal School is on the National Register of Historic Places.

Pont Reading House 

"Pont Reading House" is situated on the Easterly side of Haverford Road, Haverford Township, Delaware County, Pennsylvania, at the corner where the Ardmore Trolley passes en route between Brookline—Oakmont and Ardmore, and near Ardmore Junction Station of the Philadelphia and Western Railway. It was the home of Joshua Humphreys, the shipbuilder and naval architect known for constructing the original six frigates of the United States Navy. Here, this beautiful specimen of early American homes still stands, in an excellent state of preservation and repair, as it has since 1813, when the front section was built and added to the middle three-story section erected 1730–60, which in turn was then added to the rear and original two-story structure, built possibly as early as 1683.  One of the log walls of this first and original section can still be seen as one enters a door on one of the sides thereof, All surrounded and shaded with some large trees, of the original forest, still surviving.

Nitre Hall

The Nitre Hall Powder Mills, which gave the valley its name, were built by Israel Whelen shortly after 1800. The young nation had growing needs for explosives, and the mills prospered with an output of 800,000 pounds during the War of 1812. Nitre Hall Mills produced a quality and quantity of black powder in the U.S. second only to the Dupont Mills on the Brandywine. After the powder mills closed in 1840, Dennis Kelly bought the property and converted the buildings to the manufacture of textiles. Nitre Hall is on the National Register of Historic Places.

The Grange Estate

The Grange Estate, also known as Maen-Coch and Clifton Hall, is a historic mansion in Havertown, Pennsylvania, near Philadelphia, in Delaware County, Pennsylvania. Built in 1700 and expanded several times through the 1850s, it was purchased by Haverford Township in 1974. The building was added to the National Register of Historic Places in 1976 as The Grange.

Harford Hall

Harford Hall: Formerly, The Leedom-Dickinson Mansion. Neither Leedom nor Dickinson built the house. The earliest known occupant was Jonathan Miller, c. 1790. Harford Hall takes its name from the common Welsh name for "Haverford."  From a 1917 account: “The Leedom Mansion stands a short distance from the mills on the bank to the right of the public road. It is an imposing, well-built home, the yard adorned with noble trees, aged box bushes and cheerful lowers.” Cobb's Creek in the Days of the Old Powder Mills, Eckfeldt, John W. 1917.

Geography
Haverford Township is located in the northeast portion of Delaware County. The township is part of the Philadelphia Main Line and the Welsh Tract. Waterways in Haverford Township include Cobbs Creek, Darby Creek, Naylors Run and Meadowbrook Run.

Adjacent municipalities

Lower Merion Township, Montgomery County - northeast
City of Philadelphia - east
Upper Darby Township, Delaware County - south
Springfield Township, Delaware County - southwest
Marple Township, Delaware County - west
Radnor Township, Delaware County - northwest

Climate
Haverford Township straddles the boundary between a hot-summer humid continental climate (Dfa) and a humid subtropical climate (Cfa). The hardiness zone is 7a. The average monthly temperature in the Brookline/Oakmont vicinity ranges from 32.1 °F in January to 77.2 °F in July.

Demographics

As of Census 2010, the racial makeup of the township was 91.2% White, 2.7% African American, 0.1% Native American, 4.2% Asian, 0.5% from other races, and 1.3% from two or more races. Hispanic or Latino of any race were 1.9% of the population .

As of the census of 2000, there were 48,498 people, 18,061 households, and 13,021 families residing in the township.  The population density was 4,844.6 people per square mile (1,870.6/km).  There were 18,378 housing units at an average density of 1,835.8 per square mile (708.9/km).  The racial makeup of the township was 93.99% White, 2.12% African American, 0.10% Native American, 2.76% Asian, 0.01% Pacific Islander, 0.20% from other races, and 0.81% from two or more races. Hispanics or Latinos of any race were 0.89% of the population.

There were 18,061 households, out of which 33.3% had children under the age of 18 living with them, 60.9% were married couples living together, 8.6% had a female householder with no husband present, and 27.9% were non-families. 23.3% of all households were made up of individuals, and 12.4% had someone living alone who was 65 years of age or older.  The average household size was 2.65 and the average family size was 3.17.

The age distribution was 24.9% under the age of 18, 6.3% from 18 to 24, 28.6% from 25 to 44, 22.7% from 45 to 64, and 17.5% who were 65 years of age or older.  The median age was 39 years. For every 100 females, there were 90.6 males.  For every 100 females age 18 and over, there were 86.4 males.

According to a 2010 estimate, the median income for a household in the township was $87,283, and the median income for a family was $103,138. Males had a median income of $52,471 versus $38,852 for females. The per capita income for the township was $29,749.  About 2.0% of families and 3.7% of the population were below the poverty line, including 2.1% of those under age 18 and 4.2% of those age 65 or over.

Most common first ancestries reported in Haverford township:
 Irish (30.6%)
 Italian (22.0%)
 German (9.4%)
 English (6.1%)
 United States or American (3.1%)
 Russian (2.9%)
 Polish (2.2%)

Neighborhoods
Haverford Township is divided into smaller census designated places and neighborhoods. These reflect either historical designations or planned developments, including:

Government and politics 
The township is part of the Pennsylvania 5th congressional district, the 166th and the 163rd State House districts, and the 17th Pennsylvania State Senate District.

Haverford Township and Championship Golf 
A total of 6 men's Major Championships and 11 men's and women's US Amateur Championships, have been staged within Haverford Township. Bobby Jones completed his grand slam at Merion in 1930, and Ben Hogan made his comeback from a horrific car accident in the 1950 US Open staged at Merion.

Dow Finsterwald finished ahead of Billy Casper and Sam Snead in 1958 at Llanerch, the first PGA Championship held after the format was switched from match play to stroke play. Lee Trevino defeated Jack Nicklaus in an 18-hole playoff in 1971 at Merion when he famously tossed a rubber snake at Nicklaus on the first tee on the day of the playoff. The US Open returned to Merion in 2013, and was won by Justin Rose. 
 1904 U.S. Women's Amateur (Merion Golf Club) Georgianna Bishop
 1909 U.S. Women's Amateur (Merion Golf Club) Dorothy Campbell
 1916 U.S. Amateur (Merion Golf Club) Chick Evans
 1924 U.S. Amateur (Merion Golf Club) Bobby Jones
 1926 U.S. Women's Amateur (Merion Golf Club) Helen Stetson
 1930 U.S. Amateur (Merion Golf Club) Bobby Jones
 1934 U.S. Open (Merion Golf Club) Olin Dutra
 1949 U.S. Women's Amateur (Merion Golf Club) Dorothy Porter
 1950 U.S. Open (Merion Golf Club) Ben Hogan
 1958 PGA Championship (Llanerch Country Club) Dow Finsterwald
 1966 U.S. Amateur (Merion Golf Club) Gary Cowan
 1971 U.S. Open (Merion Golf Club) Lee Trevino
 1981 U.S. Open (Merion Golf Club) David Graham
 1989 U.S. Amateur (Merion Golf Club) Chris Patton
 1998 U.S. Girls' Junior (Merion Golf Club) Leigh Anne Hardin
 2005 U.S. Amateur (Merion Golf Club) Edoardo Molinari
 2013 U.S. Open (Merion Golf Club) Justin Rose

Transportation

Roads and highways 

The most prominent highway passing through Haverford Township is the I-476 "Blue Route", which follows a north-south alignment along the western edge of the township, though the nearest exits are in adjacent townships. U.S. Route 1 follows Township Line Road along a southwest-northeast alignment along the township's southeastern border. U.S. Route 30 follows Lancaster Avenue on a west-east alignment across the northern tip of the township. Pennsylvania Route 3 follows West Chester Pike along a northwest-southeast alignment through the southern portion of the township. Finally, Pennsylvania Route 320 briefly crosses the western tip of the township along Sproul Road.

Public transportation 
SEPTA's Norristown High Speed Line passes through Haverford Township along its route between 69th Street Transportation Center and Norristown Transportation Center and services the following stations within the township: Township Line Road, Penfield, Beechwood–Brookline, Wynnewood Road, Ardmore Junction, Ardmore Avenue, and Haverford.

Education 

The first recorded purchase of land for educational purposes in Haverford Township was made on October 28, 1797, five shillings "for the purpose of erecting a school thereon for the use of said Township of Haverford".  A stone structure erected on a site along Darby Road at the crossroads Coopertown served as a school until 1872. Today, known as the Federal School, the building still stands and serves as a window to history for Haverford Township children. Every fourth-grade student spends a day at the Federal School learning what it was like to be a student in 1797.

Public school students living in Haverford Township attend schools in the School District of Haverford Township. The District currently has a student enrollment of approximately 5,475, and, residents number over 49,000. There are seven schools in the District: Chatham Park, Chestnutwold, Coopertown, Lynnewood, and Manoa elementary schools, with grades kindergarten through 5; Haverford Middle School, with grades 6–8; and Haverford High School, with grades 9-12.

Residents of Haverford Township benefit from a wide range of school supported services, including Adult Evening School; the Golden Age Program, the Senior Citizen Prom and the Tax-Aide Program for senior citizens; and Delaware County Community College courses for all residents. Haverford, which is a member of the Delaware County Chamber of Commerce and the Main Line Chamber of Commerce, maintains partnerships with local universities and colleges, businesses, service organizations, realtors, community groups and senior citizen organizations. In 1989, the 

District's Community Relations program received a "National Achievement Award" from the National School Public Relations Association.

Haverford College is located within Haverford Township with a portion partially within Lower Merion Township, was the first College founded by the Society of Friends in the United States in 1833, has several historic structures on its 225-acre property. [2]  Of the nation's 357 "best" colleges, the Princeton Review ranks Haverford as #6 for Best Overall Undergraduate Experience. In addition, Haverford, unlike many of its peers, is located within easy travel of a large metropolitan center and the opportunities that Philadelphia offers.

Notable current and former residents 
 Garrett Brown, inventor of the Steadicam
 Mark DiFelice, former Major League Baseball pitcher for the Milwaukee Brewers organization
 Jimmy Dykes, third and second baseman for the Philadelphia Athletics and Chicago White Sox; manager of the Chicago White Sox, Philadelphia Athletics, Baltimore Orioles, Cincinnati Reds, Detroit Tigers, and Cleveland Indians
Theodore Freeman, NASA astronaut
Murray Gerstenhaber, professor, mathematician and lawyer
 Randy Grossman, former tight end for eight seasons for the Pittsburgh Steelers in the National Football League; four-time Super Bowl champion
 Brendan Hansen, Olympic swimmer and six-time medalist, former world record holder in the 100-meter and 200-meter breaststroke events
 William Hoeveler, lawyer and judge
Charles Humphreys, Pennsylvania delegate to the Continental Congress
 Joshua Humphreys, builder of the USS Constitution ("Old Ironsides")
 Steve Joachim, former professional football player for the New York Jets; won the Maxwell Award in 1974
 Ross Katz, Academy Award-nominated film producer
 Atwater Kent, inventor and prominent radio manufacturer
 Billy King, NBA executive, current general manager of the Brooklyn Nets
 John LeClair, NHL, former player, Philadelphia Flyers and Pittsburgh Penguins
 Joe Lunardi, ESPN's March Madness bracketologist
 Glen Macnow, sports talk radio host 
 Buddy Marucci, 2008 United States Senior Men's Amateur Golf Champion, U.S. Walker Cup captain 2007 and 2009, 1995 U.S. Amateur runner-up
 Clay Myers, photographer, animal welfare advocate
 Mitchel Resnick, MIT professor and creator of programmable bricks, the forerunner of LEGO Mindstorms, Scratch software and co-founder of Computer Clubhouse
 Pia Reyes, November 1988 Playboy centerfold
 Louis Robertshaw, lieutenant general in the United States Marine Corps
 Jean Shiley, high jumper, 1932 Olympic gold medal winner
 Andy Talley, head coach of Villanova University football, one of the most successful FCS college football coaches in history
 Jack Thayer, survivor of the Titanic sinking
 Michael Tollin, film director and producer
 Jennifer Toof, appeared on VH1's Flavor of Love 2, Flavor of Love Girls: Charm School, and I Love Money
 Sam Venuto, former American football running back in the National Football League.
 Tom Verica, actor and director
Charles Alan Wright (1927-2000), American constitutional lawyer widely considered to have been the foremost authority in the United States on constitutional law and federal procedure; law professor, University of Texas School of Law, (1955-2000), University of Minnesota Law School (1950-1955)
 Jeff Yass, stock and commodity market manager
 Mark G. Yudof, president, University of California (June 2008 – present); former chancellor, University of Texas system (August 2002 to May 2008), former president, University of Minnesota (1997 to 2002)
 Marian Hill, an electronic duo consisting of Jeremy Lloyd and Samantha Gongol, who made their debut in 2016, with an AirPods commercial with their hit single “Down”

Points of interest 
 Haverford College
 Haverford College Arboretum
 The Haverford School
 Merion Golf Club
 Llanerch Country Club
Old Haverford Friends Meetinghouse
Grange Estate

See also

Bensalem Township
Cheltenham Township
Lower Merion Township
Upper Darby Township

References

External links

Haverford Township
Haverford Township Historical Society

 
Home Rule Municipalities in Pennsylvania
Philadelphia Main Line
Populated places established in 1682
Townships in Delaware County, Pennsylvania
Townships in Pennsylvania
Welsh-American culture in Pennsylvania